The Persian Empire usually refers to the Achaemenid Empire (550 BC to 330 BC), an ancient Iranian empire based in Western Asia and founded by Cyrus the Great.

The Persian Empire may also refer to:

 The Parthian Empire (247 BC–224 AD)
 The Sasanian Empire (224–661)
 The Tahirid dynasty (821–873)
 The Alavid dynasty (864–928)
 The Saffarid dynasty (861–1003)
 The Samanid dynasty (875–999)
 The Ziyarid dynasty (928–1043)
 The Buyid dynasty (932–1056)
 The Ghaznavid dynasty (962–1187)
 The Seljuk dynasty (1037–1194)
 The Khwarazmian dynasty (1077–1231)
 The Ilkhanid dynasty (1256–1388)
 The Muzaffarid dynasty (1314–1393)
 The Timurid Empire (1369–1507)
 The Safavid Iran (1501–1736)
 The Afsharid Iran (1736–1796)
 The Zand dynasty (1750–1794)
 The Qajar Iran (1785–1925)
 The Pahlavi Iran (1925–1979)